Benhur Kivalu (born 2 September 1972 in Vailoa) is a Samoan-born Tongan former rugby union player. He played as a lock and as a number eight.

Career
His first international match for Tonga was against Samoa, at Sydney, on 18 September 1998. He was also part of the 1999 and 2003 World Cup rosters. His last match for the 'Ikale Tahi was against Samoa, at Nuku'alofa, on 22 July 2005.

Post-career
After his playing career, he was the coach of Tonga national under-20 rugby union team. Currently, he is the "Regional Development Officer" for Tonga Rugby Union.

References

External links

1972 births
Living people
Samoan emigrants to Tonga
Tonga international rugby union players
Tongan rugby union coaches
Tongan rugby union players
Expatriate rugby union players in Japan
Rugby union locks
Rugby union number eights